"Moondreams" is a song written by Norman Petty and released in 1957 by The Norman Petty Trio.  Featured musicians are Petty on organ, Buddy Holly on guitar, Vi Petty on piano, Mike Mitchell on percussion and the Picks on backing vocals.

"Moondreams" was one of the four songs recorded by Buddy Holly in a session on October 21, 1958 at the Pythian Temple in NYC with the Dick Jacobs orchestra, the other tracks being "True Love Ways", "Raining in My Heart", and "It Doesn't Matter Anymore".

This version of "Moondreams" was released on The Buddy Holly Story, Vol. 2 and as the B-side to "True Love Ways" (May 20, 1960) in the UK.

Denny Laine released the song as a single in 1977.  Record World called Laine's version "a light, lilting ballad that, like many a Holly classic, was never a hit for him" but that "Laine's version should set things straight."

References

1957 songs
Buddy Holly songs
Songs written by Norman Petty
1957 singles
Columbia Records singles
Song recordings produced by Paul McCartney
Capitol Records singles
EMI Records singles